Cosmopterix issikiella is a moth of the family Cosmopterigidae. It is found in Taiwan.

References

Moths described in 1957
issikiella